Costa Rica is a municipality located in the Brazilian state of Mato Grosso do Sul. Its population was 21,142 (2020) and its area is 5,723 km².

The municipality contains 17.3% of the  Nascentes do Rio Taquari State Park, created in 1999.

See also
Costa Rica (country in Central America)

References

Municipalities in Mato Grosso do Sul